Nicholas Hurleston (by 1491 – will made 1531), of London, was an English politician.

He was a Member of Parliament (MP) for Rochester in 1529.

References

15th-century births
1531 deaths
People from Rochester, Kent
English MPs 1529–1536